Billy Gustafsson  (8 February 1948 – 6 April 2018) was a Swedish social democratic politician who was a member of the Riksdag 2002–2014.

References
Billy Gustafsson (S)

1948 births
2018 deaths
Members of the Riksdag from the Social Democrats
Members of the Riksdag 2002–2006
People from Norrköping